Otaku Girl is a science fiction novel written by Louis Bulaong and published on June 23, 2021. The story was first posted as a webnovel, becoming noted for its postmodern elements and pop culture references, before being published as a book four months later. It is the sequel to Bulaong's debut novel Escapist Dream.

Plot
The story takes place in a virtual reality world called the Escapist Dream, a place that allows anyone who visits it to gain superhuman abilities derived from characters in films, comics, anime, video games, and other fictional media. A year before the start of the novel, the virtual reality world suffered a malfunction which trapped its visitors inside. They are then forced to fight for survival against rogue artificial intelligences who have begun attacking them.

The main character of the story is GI, a teenage Japanese otaku, who is forced to fight for her life inside the Escapist Dream. The protagonist of the first novel, Charlie Anderson, also returns to assist the trapped geeks. Both GI and Charlie must fight against powerful AIs who have taken over the different areas of the Escapist Dream, such as Stan City, the place inspired by American comic book and superhero fiction; Otaku Academy, a place inspired by Japanese manga and anime; Gamer's Den, an area inspired by video games and gaming culture; and the Library, an area influenced by classic literature.

Publication history
Author Louis Bulaong published Otaku Girl in February 2021 in web format through various online publications. The story was written as a satire to geek culture combined with GameLit elements. Bulaong intentionally made the writing style and story to be as "wacky as possible" by including informal writing, memes, and tropes. He also wrote it as a commentary to cancel culture. According to journalist Janet Webby, this gave the book a more postmodern feel, saying, "[Bulaong] makes the writing even weirder by pseudo-breaking the fourth wall a few times in hilarious ways."

Reception
The novel was met with positive reception by various websites upon release, with Royal Road giving it 4.55/5, Webnovel giving it 5/5, and Scribblehub giving it 5/5. During its first week on Amazon, it became the best-selling non-Kindle Unlimited indie book, selling over 1,000 copies in the first 24 hours. It gained significant praise in the author's native country of the Philippines, becoming one of the best books written by a Filipino in 2021.

Janet Webby from Indie Brag stated, "I've never read anything like it. It's like a postmodern novel for geeks and nerds; a lot of the things that happen in it are things an average reader wouldn't get. But it's hilarious if you know your anime and comic books." Literary critic Carl Hannigan from Geeks gave it a 5 out of 5 rating, praising its surrealism while saying, "Otaku Girl is one of the best reflections of modern society that I've read this year. It is relatable, humorous, and sends a message to how we exist in the modern culture. I know I've become a bit too deep with this book, but overall, the humor and the story are amazing. If you're a hardcore geek, then I suggest you buy this book and have a great time laughing and crying."

References

External links
 Otaku Girl in Bookois

2021 science fiction novels
Action novels
Novels about virtual reality
Young adult novels
Postmodern novels
Nerd culture
Otaku
Self-published books
Internet memes